Flos fulgida, the shining plushblue, is a species of lycaenid or blue butterfly found in the Indomalayan realm, including India. The species was first described by William Chapman Hewitson in 1863.

Subspecies
F. f. fulgida Sikkim, Assam – Myanmar, Thailand, Laos
F. f. singhapura (Distant, 1885) Peninsular Malaya, Singapore, Sumatra, Java, Borneo
F. f. zilana (Fruhstorfer, 1900) Philippines (Basilan, Mindoro)

References

Flos
Fauna of Pakistan
Butterflies of Asia
Butterflies of Singapore